Stroppo is a comune (municipality) in the Province of Cuneo in the Italian region of Piedmont, located about  southwest of Turin and about  northwest of Cuneo.

Stroppo borders the following municipalities: Elva, Macra, Marmora, Prazzo and Sampeyre.

References

Cities and towns in Piedmont